Ashutosh Singh (born 25 September 1982) is a former professional tennis player from India.

Biography
A right-handed player from Delhi, Singh comes from a family deeply involved in tennis. He is the son of Balram Singh, a national tennis coach. His brother Lalit is a chair umpire who has officiated at grand slam level.

Tennis career
Singh competed mostly on the Futures and Challenger circuits. Most successful as a doubles player, he won 17 Futures titles and two Challenger titles in doubles.

His only main draw appearance on the ATP Tour came in the doubles at the 2007 Chennai Open. He and Vishal Uppal were entered as wildcards and lost in the first round to Tomas Behrend and Robin Vik.

Both of his two Challenger titles came in 2008, partnering Harsh Mankad in separate tournaments in New Delhi. This made them the first Indian pair in two years to win a tournament at Challenger level.

In 2009 he reached his highest ranking in doubles of 150 in the world.

Personal life
He is married to Renuka Singh.

Challenger titles

Doubles: (2)

References

External links
 
 

1982 births
Living people
Indian male tennis players
Racket sportspeople from Delhi